Khatyspytia is a frondose member of the Ediacara biota. 
It is slender, with many short branches, and is named after the Khatyspyt Formation.

See also
 List of Ediacaran genera

References

Ediacaran life
Fossils of Russia
Ediacaran Asia
Ediacaran Europe
Ediacaran first appearances